The Pirate Party Germany, commonly known as Pirates, is a political party in Germany founded in September 2006 at c-base. It states general agreement with the Swedish Piratpartiet as a party of the information society; it is part of the international movement of pirate parties and a member of the Pirate Parties International. In 2011-12, the party succeeded in attaining a high enough vote share to enter four state parliaments (Berlin, North Rhine-Westphalia, Saarland and Schleswig-Holstein) and the European Parliament. However, their popularity rapidly declined and by 2017 they had no representation in any of the German state parliaments. Their one European MEP, Patrick Breyer, is in the Greens–European Free Alliance group. Together with Marcel Kolaja, Markéta Gregorová and Mikuláš Peksa from the Czech Pirate Party they build up the European Pirate Party team for the European Parliament in Brussels.

According to political theorist Oskar Niedermayer, the party sees itself as part of an international movement to shape with their term of "digital revolution" which is a circumscription for the transition into information society. With their focus on freedom in the net and their fight against government regulations of this sphere, they caught the attention especially of the younger generation. Even if the network policy is the core identity of the party, it is now more than just an advocacy party of "digital natives" and characterises itself as a social-liberal-progressive.

Former federal chairman Sebastian Nerz sees the party as social-liberal party of fundamental rights which among other things wants to advocate for political transparency.

Party platform 

The party supports the preservation of current civil rights in telephony and on the Internet; in particular, it opposes the European data retention policies.

The party favors the civil right to information privacy and reforms of copyright, education, genetic patents and drug policy.

In particular, it promotes an enhanced transparency of government by implementing open source governance and providing for APIs to allow for electronic inspection and monitoring of government operations by the citizen.

The Pirate Party also supports an unconditional basic income for citizens and direct democracy via e-democracy.

History 

The party was founded on 10 September 2006. Thorsten Wirth has been the Party Leader since 30 November 2013.

In February 2009, the village spokesperson of Hohenstein and as such city councillor in Strausberg Jens Knoblich joined the Pirate Party Germany. In late August 2009, Herbert Rusche, one of the founding members of the German Green Party and, in the 1980s, the first openly gay member of parliament in Germany, joined the Pirate Party. During the 2011 Berlin state election, the party entered a state parliament for the first time when the Berlin party chapter received 8.9 percent of the votes for the state parliament of Berlin. , the party had around 35,000 members.

Election results

2009 federal election 
On 27 September 2009, the Pirates received 2.0% (845,904 votes) in the 2009 German federal election, thus not securing any seats in the Bundestag. However, this was still the best result among parties that did not meet the 5% threshold. Among first-time male voters, the party received 13%.

On account of the election results in 2009, the party fulfils the conditions for receiving public allowances. For 2009, it received €31,504.68 (the same amount as it received from private contributions) which was exclusively due to the Pirates state associations Saxony and Schleswig-Holstein. The calculation was made based on the total receipts of the party in 2008.  The possible upper limit of the public allowance matching for the party is a rate of €840,554.51.

2009 European Parliament election 

It received 229,117 votes in the 2009 European Parliament election, which was 0.9%, but not enough (at least 5%) for a seat.

State and regional elections 
On 30 August 2009, the Pirates received 1.9% in the 2009 Saxony state election. On the same day, the party also received one seat in each council in the local elections of Münster and Aachen, although candidates of the party ran for office only in some constituencies of both cities.

Support for The Pirates differs somewhat between States. The party received 1.8% in the 2009 Schleswig-Holstein state election and 1.5% in the 2010 North Rhine-Westphalia state election (though without securing seats), but only 0.5% in the 2009 Hesse state election and did not participate in the 2009 Brandenburg and Saarland state elections.

The party received 2.1% in the 2011 Hamburg state elections, though it was not yet enough to gain seats in the State parliament. In the 2011 Baden-Württemberg state election the Pirate Party was able to repeat this result. In the 2011 Saxony-Anhalt state election they received 1.4% or 13,828 votes; in the 2011 Rhineland-Palatinate state election they achieved 1.6% of the votes.

In the 2011 Berlin state election, with 8.9% of the votes the Pirate Party of Berlin managed for the first time to overcome the 5% threshold and to win seats (numbering 15 out of 141 seats in the ) in a German state parliament. This was quite a surprise for them, since they only had 15 candidates on the ballot. In response to their election, however, Mayor Klaus Wowereit criticized their lack of diversity, most notably the lack of women in the party.

In March 2012, the Pirates received 7.4% of the vote and thus won 4 seats in the Landtag of Saarland.

Subsequent 2012 polls have shown an increase in popularity in the Party. In May 2012, they won 8.2% of the vote in Schleswig-Holstein, which was sufficient to enter the state parliament, gaining 6 seats, being led by Torge Schmidt from 2013 until 2017. Also in May 2012, they won 7.8% of the vote in North Rhine-Westphalia, gaining 20 seats.

2013 federal election
After those successful state elections, the party was able to score up to 13% in nationwide polls. However, after a string of scandals and internal disputes which were handled unprofessionally and picked up by the media, the party lost the trust of voters and entered a steady decline in polls.

As a result, in the Lower Saxony state election in January 2013, the Pirate Party was only able to gain about 2.1% of the votes, missing the 5% threshold needed to gain actual seats in the state parliament. Six months later during the Bavaria state election of 2013 the Pirates fared similarly, receiving again only 2% of the votes. At the 2013 German federal elections the following weekend, the party suffered another major defeat where it was again only able to achieve 2.2% of the votes, leading to the resignation of party leader .

2014 European Parliament election 

In the 2014 European parliament elections, the Pirate Party received 1.45% of the national vote (424,510 votes in total) and returned a single Member of the European Parliament. The elected MEP, Felix Reda, joined the Greens–European Free Alliance as an independent.

2016 Berlin state election 

The Berlin state election on September witnessed the collapse of support for the Pirate Party in their previous stronghold of Berlin.  Their previous vote of 8.9% achieved in 2011 fell to 1.7% and the Pirate Party lost all representation in the Berlin State assembly. The poor result was compounded by the murder suicide of former Pirate Party assembly member Gerwald Claus-Brunner.

2017 dropout from state parliaments 

Together with the satirical party  the Pirate Party nominated  as candidate for the German presidential election in February 2017.

The Pirate Party continued to decline in 2017, dropping out from state parliaments. In the Saarland state election in March 2017, the Pirate Party received only 0.7% of the voter share and therefore lost all its seats in the Landtag of the Saarland. With the North Rhine-Westphalia state election in which it lost every seat, the Pirate Party is no longer represented in any state parliament.

2019 European Parliament election 

In the 2019 European Parliament election, the Pirate Party retained their MEP seat, with their lead candidate Patrick Breyer being elected.

References

External links

Junge Piraten  (youth organisation)

 
Anti-corruption parties
Liberal parties in Germany
Social liberal parties
Germany
Parties represented in the European Parliament
Direct democracy parties
Political parties supporting universal basic income